Konstantin Yuryevich Golovskoy (born 25 April 1975) is a Russian former footballer. He also holds Kazakhstani citizenship.

Achievements
 Russian Premier League winner: 1996, 1997, 1998.
 Russian Cup winner: 1998.
 Bulgarian A Professional Football Group winner: 2001, 2002
 Bulgarian A Professional Football Group runner-up: 2003, 2004.
 Bulgarian Cup winner: 2002, 2003.
 Kazakhstan Premier League winner: 2007, 2008
 Kazakhstan Premier League runner-up: 2006.
 Kazakhstan Cup winner: 2008
 Kazakhstan Super Cup winner: 2008

External links
 Profile at LevskiSofia.info

Footballers from Moscow
Russian footballers
Russia under-21 international footballers
FC Spartak Moscow players
Russian Premier League players
FC Dynamo Moscow players
FC Akhmat Grozny players
PFC Levski Sofia players
FC Zhenis Astana players
FC Aktobe players
FC Tobol players
FC Taraz players
Russian expatriate footballers
Expatriate footballers in Bulgaria
Expatriate footballers in Kazakhstan
1975 births
Living people
Russian expatriate sportspeople in Bulgaria
Russian expatriate sportspeople in Kazakhstan
Russian emigrants to Kazakhstan
Naturalised citizens of Kazakhstan
First Professional Football League (Bulgaria) players
Kazakhstan Premier League players
Association football midfielders
Association football defenders
FC Olimp-Dolgoprudny players